Revolutionary Socialist Party (Left) is a splinter faction of Revolutionary Socialist Party of India in Kerala. The party is an ally of Left Democratic Front.

Merger with CMP (John)
In 2018, RSP (Left) split,
RSP (left) C.P Karthikeyan Group merged with Communist Marxist Party (John) led by C. P. John.
RSP(Left) still continue alliance with LDF (Left Democratic Front), Last Re-organisation of LDF in 2018 December 26, After this Re-Organisation LDF Convener A.Vijaya Raghavan Said RSP(Left) is the Alliance party of LDF, Sasikumar cherukole led by RSP(Left).

Revolutionary Socialist Party
Political parties with year of establishment missing